Sciota marmorata is a species of snout moth in the genus Sciota. It was described by Sergei Alphéraky in 1877. It is found in Romania, Ukraine and Russia.

The larvae have been recorded feeding on Caragana arborescens and Robinia pseudoacacia.

References

External links
Lepiforum.de

Moths described in 1877
Phycitini
Moths of Europe